Hadrian's Library was created by Roman Emperor Hadrian in AD 132 on the north side of the Acropolis of Athens.

The building followed a typical Roman forum architectural style, having only one entrance with a propylon of Corinthian order, a high surrounding wall with protruding niches (oikoi, exedrae) at its long sides, an inner courtyard surrounded by columns and a decorative oblong pool in the middle. The library was on the eastern side where rolls of papyrus "books" were kept. Adjoining halls were used as reading rooms, and the corners served as lecture halls.

The library was seriously damaged by the Herulian invasion of 267 and repaired by the prefect Herculius in AD 407–412. During Byzantine times, three churches were built at the site, the remains of which are preserved:
a tetraconch (5th century AD)
a three-aisled basilica (7th century), and
a simple cathedral (12th century), which was the first cathedral of the city, known as Megali Panagia.

Around the same period as the cathedral another church, Agios Asomatos sta Skalia, was built against the north facade, but it is not preserved.

See also
Library of Pantainos

References

External links

132
Buildings and structures completed in the 2nd century
Ancient Greek buildings and structures in Athens
Landmarks in Athens
Ancient Roman buildings and structures in Greece
Roman Athens
Library
Ancient libraries
Libraries in Greece